Polje Čepić or Čepić, is a village in Istria County, Croatia, in the municipality of Kršan. In 2011, the population of the village was 148.

Description 
It is located in the eastern part of Istria, on the western slopes of mountain Učka along the Čepić field, on the state road D500, 1.3 km south from neighboring village Purgarija Čepić, and 5.8 km north east from the municipal center Kršan (D64).

History 

The village territory was first mentioned in 1102 at the time of Patriarchate of Aquileia in the grant by Ulric II to the Aquileia patriarchs, as part of Kožljak castle estate. In 1287 was founded Paulist monastery of St. Mary (also called the Monastery of Our Lady of the Lake). In 1385, the Kožljak lord Filip Gutenegg richly endowed the monastery. In 1606 the monastery is mentioned as župa (parish). In 1783 the monastery was disbanded and the property was sold out to Johann Weikhard from Auersperg noble family. The tombstone with Glagolitic inscription of Kožljak lord Martin Moysevich (1492), which was in the monastery, was relocated to castle chapel in Belaj.

In the hamlet Kloštar was sacral, while in Purgarija profane part of Čepić. The Purgarija was called according to the German word Bürger (citizen), and the former Burg (Engl. Castle). The castle was devastated in the Uskok War (1615-1617), but it was rebuilt. Although the last remains of the ruins were removed at the time of lake drying in 1930, he can be seen in Valvasor engraving from 1679, when was in Auersperg family property.

Inhabitants mainly live from agriculture on fertile field that was created by drying of Lake Čepić in 1930. Before also from lake fishery.

Population 

Note: The data in 1857, 1869, 1921, 1931 and partially in 1880 and 1890, are contained in neighboring village Purgarija Čepić. Named as Polje-Čepić from 1948 until 1971.

References 

Bibliography

 
 

Sources

External links 
 Čepić on Municipality of Kršan site 
 Istria on the Internet - Čepić

Populated places in Istria County